Rhadamanthus was a just ruler in Greek mythology, son of Zeus and Europa.

Rhadamanthus may also refer to:

 38083 Rhadamanthus, a trans-Neptunian object
 Rhadamanthus, a genus of plants included in the genus Drimia
 Rhadamanthus (horse), a British Thoroughbred racehorse